The following is a list of the 25 cantons of the Réunion department, in France, following the French canton reorganisation which came into effect in March 2015:

 L'Étang-Salé
 Le Port
 La Possession
 Saint-André-1
 Saint-André-2
 Saint-André-3
 Saint-Benoît-1
 Saint-Benoît-2
 Saint-Denis-1
 Saint-Denis-2
 Saint-Denis-3
 Saint-Denis-4
 Sainte-Marie
 Saint-Joseph
 Saint-Leu
 Saint-Louis-1
 Saint-Louis-2
 Saint-Paul-1
 Saint-Paul-2
 Saint-Paul-3
 Saint-Pierre-1
 Saint-Pierre-2
 Saint-Pierre-3
 Le Tampon-1
 Le Tampon-2

References

Geography of Réunion
Reunion 2